Betty Boop, M.D. is a 1932 Fleischer Studios animated short film starring Betty Boop, and featuring Koko the Clown and Bimbo. The animated short is certainly one of the more surreal entries in the Betty Boop filmography.

Plot
Betty, Bimbo and Koko are the owners of a traveling medicine show. They are selling "Jippo", an all-purpose health tonic. Koko's contortionist display doesn't convince the local townsfolk to open their wallets, but Betty song and dance gets the whole town eager to buy their product.  Betty, Koko and Bimbo sell bottles. Drinking the tonic causes everyone to exhibit strange side-effects.  A feeble old man drinks some and becomes a large baby, while a baby drinking it becomes an old man.  Other effect seen include massive weight gain, unusual hair growth, rapid changes in shape and size, and even death.

The cartoon's ending makes a reference to "Dr. Jekyll and Mr. Hyde", a movie adaptation which was released earlier that year by Paramount Pictures,

The film is now owned by Warner Bros. via Turner Entertainment Co.

Music
Betty sings "Now's the Time to Fall in Love" with the words changed to "Now's the time to buy Jippo".  An old man's heart sings "Darling, I Am Growing Old-er" from Silver Threads Among the Gold.  
The animated short features the song "Nobody's Sweetheart", followed by a scat vocal variations. The recording artist was long assumed to be Cliff Edwards aka "Ukulele Ike"; it is certainly in the style which he made famous. However, some state it was William Costello, which wouldn't be unlikely, considering he did the voice acting of later Popeye shorts, and that Costello recorded very good imitations of the "Ukulele Ike" style under the pseudonym "Red Pepper Sam".

References

External links
 Betty Boop, M.D. at the Big Cartoon Database
 Betty Boop, M.D. at the IMDb
 Betty Boop, M.D. on YouTube

1932 films
1932 animated films
Betty Boop cartoons
Short films directed by Dave Fleischer
1930s American animated films
American black-and-white films
Paramount Pictures short films
Fleischer Studios short films
Animated films about dogs
Films about drugs
Films about pseudoscience